Olga Orozco (17 March 1920 – 15 August 1999) (real name Olga Noemí Gugliotta Orozco) was an Argentine poet. She was a recipient of the FIL Award.

Biography
She was born in Toay, La Pampa, to Carmelo Gugliotta, a Sicilian from Capo d'Orlando, and an Argentinean mother, Cecilia Orozco. She spent her childhood in Bahía Blanca until she was 16 years old and she moved to Buenos Aires with her parents, where she studied at the Faculty of Philosophy and Letters of the University of Buenos Aires, and later initiated her career as a writer. She started to work for a newspaper company. There she would take up varies names and publish works with different pseudonym.

Orozco directed some literary publications using some pseudonymous names while she worked as a journalist. She was a member of so-called  «Tercera Vanguardia» generation, which had a strong surrealist tendency. No other information was provided about the group other than the fact that it functioned like a political party. Her poetic works were influenced by Rimbaud, Nerval, Baudelaire, Miłosz and Rilke. Due to her background in literature she was well respected and taken seriously. Her works have been translated into various languages.

Olga Orozco died in Buenos Aires from a heart attack at the age of 79.

Prizes 
«Primer Premio Municipal de Poesía»
«Premio de Honor de la Fundación Argentina» (1971)
«Gran Premio del Fondo Nacional de las Artes»
«Premio Esteban Echeverría»
«Gran Premio de Honor» de la SADE, «Premio Nacional de Teatro a Pieza Inédita» (1972)
«Premio Nacional de Poesía» (1988)
«Laurea de Poesia della Università di Torino»
«Premio Gabriela Mistral»
«Premio de Literatura Latinoamericana y del Caribe Juan Rulfo» (1998).

Tribute 
On March 17, 2020, Google celebrated her 100th birthday with a Google Doodle.

Main works 
Engravings Torn from Insomnia, trans Mary Crow, BOA Editions, Ltd., 2002. Finalist for a PEN USA Translation Award.  Published with a Lannan grant.

"The poet sees poetry even in the most mundane things" ("El poeta ve lo poético aun en las cosas más cotidianas")
Desde lejos (From Far Away) (1946)
Las muertes (The Deaths) (1951)
Los juegos peligrosos (Dangerous Games) (1962)
La oscuridad es otro sol(Darkness Is a Different Sun) (1967)
Museo salvaje (Wild Museum) (1974)
Veintinueve poemas (29 Poems) (1975)
Cantos a Berenice (Songs for Berenice) (1977)
Mutaciones de la realidad (Reality Mutations) (1979)
La noche a la deriva (The Drifted Night) (1984) 
En el revés del cielo (In Heaven's Back Side) (1987)
Con esta boca, en este mundo (With This Mouth, In This World) (1994).

References

External links 
Short Biography (Spanish)
On her death (Spanish)

1920 births
1999 deaths
People from La Pampa Province
Argentine women poets
20th-century Argentine women writers
20th-century Argentine writers
20th-century Argentine poets
Argentine radio actresses
Pseudonymous women writers
Argentine people of Sicilian descent
University of Buenos Aires alumni
Surrealist poets
Surrealist writers
Argentine surrealist artists
Argentine surrealist writers
Women surrealist artists
Surrealist artists
20th-century pseudonymous writers